Mystery 101 is an American/Canadian series of mystery TV movies created by Robin Bernheim and Lee Goldberg. It stars Jill Wagner, Kristoffer Polaha and Robin Thomas. The series airs on the Hallmark Movies & Mysteries channel in the United States and on the W Network in Canada.

Premise
Amy Winslow (Wagner) is a professor of English literature who specializes in mystery and crime fiction. In the first film, a case involving a student at her college has Amy consulting for Travis Burke (Polaha), a "big city" police detective who has recently moved to Amy's small town of Garrison, Washington. Amy's widower father, Graham Winslow (Thomas), is the author of a bestselling series of detective novels and often helps Amy when she's in a pinch. As crimes unfold in the area, Amy inserts herself into Burke's investigations, often against his wishes, while the two develop an increasingly strong friendship. In the first three films, Burke is also assisted by Claire Tate (Sarah Dudgale), a rookie detective who is the daughter of Garrison's police chief. Meanwhile, Amy's teaching assistant Bud (Preston Vanderslice) often helps her on cases with research and other tasks.

Main cast
Jill Wagner as Amy Winslow, a college literature professor who holds a class on crime fiction
Kristoffer Polaha as Travis Burke, a newly transferred police detective
Robin Thomas as Graham Winslow, a famous author and Amy's father
Preston Vanderslice as Bud, Amy's talented teaching assistant
Derek Green as Chief Tate, police chief and Travis' boss
Sarah Dugdale as Claire Tate, Chief Tate's daughter and a rookie detective

Characters

 A dark grey cell indicates the character was not in the film.

Films

Production and filming  
Parts of the first film were shot in Squamish, British Columbia, Canada.

References

External links

American film series
American mystery films
American television films
Canadian mystery films
Canadian television films
Hallmark Channel original programming
Hallmark Channel original films